Slave Vows is the fifth studio album by Los-Angeles hardcore punk band The Icarus Line. It was released in August 2013 under Agitated Records.

Track listing

References

2013 albums
The Icarus Line albums